The Associated Schools of NSW Inc, most commonly referred to as the Committee of Associated Schools (CAS), is a group of six independent schools located in Sydney, which share common interests, ethics, educational philosophy and contest sporting events between themselves. In addition, CAS members often compete with members of the Athletic Association of the Great Public Schools of New South Wales (GPS) and members of the Independent Schools Association (ISA).

History 
The CAS was initiated in 1928 by Knox Grammar School’s first headmaster, Neil MacNeil, when he proposed an association with Barker College, Cranbrook School, Trinity Grammar School, All Saints' College and St Aloysius' College.

The association was formed in 1929 to provide sporting and co-curricular competition with the foundation members being the above schools with the exception of All Saints', who were not mentioned again. Waverley College had its application of June 1929 deferred until it finally joined in the 1940s. This was because the headmaster of Trinity Grammar School throughout the 1930s came to an impasse with Waverley headmaster at the time, Br Edward Nelson, over school fee issues. This issue questioned the integrity of the school and the application was held up until 1941. At this point in time Waverley had a new headmaster, Br Andrew Denman.

The CAS primarily provides sporting competitions between the various schools, including swimming and athletics, the summer sports cricket and basketball, and the winter sports rugby union, football (soccer), and cross country. CAS also offers a wide range of cultural activities such as cadet competitions, chess, debating and public speaking. Since 1935, a representative from each CAS and GPS school has competed in the Lawrence Campbell Oratory Competition.

Representatives from all six schools meet regularly to determine sporting schedules, school terms, competitions and address any issues arising from the CAS competition.

Sydney Grammar School often participates in debating competitions and some sport (mainly volleyball) hosted by the CAS board.

Tony Higgins, dean of careers at Knox Grammar School, manages the employment relations aspect of the association. John Day and Roger Seaborn, members of the Trinity Grammar School Council, also form part of this committee and are responsible for the day-to-day operation of the CAS. August Courtis is in charge of the Public Relations Department.

The meeting of the representatives of the CAS in April 2006 saw the introduction of a cadet drill competition, suggested by Helen Clarke of Knox Grammar School and Gordon Barkl of the Barker College School Council. This was intended to further enhance the links between the six CAS schools. In June 2006, the CAS committee initiated the first joint-scholarship programme for academic performance. Awarded annually, the student attaining the scholarship is granted six years of secondary education at any of the six CAS schools.

The annual meeting of the CAS committee in April 2007 saw the introduction of lawn bowls as an official CAS sport through the initiative of Pete Mullers and Chantal Hunter of the Waverley College sport department. The event also saw the proposal of the introduction of a common teaching/learning program in the academic side of each of the six participating schools. The program has been drafted by Shane Sedgman and Jenny Emery of Knox Grammar School. The head of the CAS committee, Dougal Parr, also announced his decision to step down from his position and was replaced by his deputy, Edward Bradshaw.

On 4 May 2007, English faculty executives from the six CAS schools attended a conference held at Knox Grammar School to commence the drafting of a common learning program. Headed by the dean of English of Knox Grammar School and Barker College, Steve Parsons and Ann Lawless Bean, assessment tasks, examinations and teaching schedules were devised for the academic year commencing 2008. The mathematics department attended a similar seminar on 7 May 2007 and was headed by Michael Harnwell and Ian Schultz.

Schools

Member schools

Competitive events 
 Athletics
 Basketball
 Chess
 Cadets
 Cricket
 Cross country
 Fishing
 Rifle shooting
 Rugby union
 Soccer 
 Swimming
 Volleyball
 Water polo
 Squash
 Tennis
 Debating
 Lawn bowls
 Diving

CAS full code

Champions

Trophies awarded

Rugby 
The Henry Plume Shield, named after the founder of Barker, is awarded to the winners of the 1st XV competition.

Cricket 
The Archer Shield, named after one of Knox's founders and benefactors, Andrew Reid.

Swimming 
The Thyne Challenge Shield is awarded to the winner of the CAS Swimming Championships. "Thyne" was the maiden name of the wife of Andrew Reid, after whom the athletics trophy is named.

Basketball 
The Associated Schools of NSW Basketball Shield is awarded to the winner of the 1st V basketball competition.

Football (soccer) 
The Thomas Grimson OAM Cup is awarded to the winner of the 1st XI soccer competition. It is named after Thomas Grismon, a life member of the Australian and NSW Soccer Federation.

Tennis 
The CAS Tennis Trophy is awarded to the winner of the 1st IV summer tennis competition.
The CAS Winter Trophy is awarded to the winner of the 1st IV winter tennis competition.

Drill 
The CAS Drill Trophy is awarded to the winner of the CAS Cadet Drill Competition. The competition was started in 2002 and includes the Cadet Units from all the schools except Cranbrook. St Aloysius competed for the first time in 2018.

Debating 
The CAS Debating Cup was first awarded in 1991.

Cross country 
The winner of the Opens team event at the CAS Cross Country Championships is awarded The Neil Logan CAS Cross Country Shield. It was first awarded in 1993.

See also 
 List of schools in New South Wales

References

External links
 CAS website
 Barker College
 Cranbrook School
 Knox Grammar School
 St Aloysius' College
 Trinity Grammar School
 Waverley College

 
Australian school sports associations